The 2004–05 season was PAOK Football Club's 79th in existence and the club's 46th consecutive season in the top flight of Greek football. The team will enter the Greek Football Cup in the first round and will also enter in Champions League  starting from the third qualifying round.

Players

Squad

Transfers

Players transferred in

Players transferred out

Kit

Friendlies

Competitions

Overview

Managerial statistics

Alpha Ethniki

League table

Results summary

Results by round

Matches

Greek Cup

 (Need match reports for all games. Please help.)

First round

Second round

UEFA Champions League

Third qualifying round

UEFA Cup

First round

Statistics

Squad statistics

! colspan="13" style="background:#DCDCDC; text-align:center" | Goalkeepers
|-

! colspan="13" style="background:#DCDCDC; text-align:center" | Defenders
|-

! colspan="13" style="background:#DCDCDC; text-align:center" | Midfielders
|-

! colspan="13" style="background:#DCDCDC; text-align:center" | Forwards
|-

	

|}
1 Missing stats for Cup. PAOK played four games in competition. Please Help.

Goalscorers

Notes

References

Source: Match reports in competitive matches, uefa.com, uefa.com,  worldfootball.net

External links
 PAOK FC official website

PAOK FC seasons
PAOK